Michael Tadross is an American film producer and former executive at Paramount Pictures. Films that he either produced or was executive producer include Indecent Proposal, Die Hard with a Vengeance, which became the highest-grossing film of 1995, Eraser, The Devil's Advocate, The Thomas Crown Affair, I Am Legend, Sherlock Holmes and Gangster Squad.

As Executive Vice President of Production at Paramount Pictures, he was in charge of production of films such as Forrest Gump, The Firm, Beverly Hills Cop III, among others.

Biography 
Michael Tadross was born in Brooklyn, New York. He graduated with a B.A. from Wagner College and received the Wagner College Distinguished Graduate Award. He was awarded an Honorary Doctorate of Fine Arts from Long Island University in 2018.

He began his film career as a camera trainee and assistant film editor. Tadross is a member of the Producers Guild of America, the Directors Guild of America, and the Academy of Motion Pictures Arts & Sciences.

Tadross also served as Executive Vice President in charge of production at Paramount Pictures from 1991 to 1994 where he oversaw the production of blockbusters such as Forrest Gump, The Firm, Clear and Present Danger, Wayne's World, Searching for Bobby Fischer, Beverly Hills Cop III, Addams Family Values, Coneheads, Flesh and Bone, The Thing Called Love, and Sliver.

Filmography 
He was producer for all films unless otherwise noted.

Film

Production manager

Second unit director or assistant director

As an actor

Television

Second unit director or assistant director

References

External links 
 Michael Tadross at IMDB
 Michael Tadross at Rotten Tomatoes
 Michael Tadross at Amazon Prime Video

American producers
Paramount Pictures executives
People from Brooklyn
American people of Lebanese descent
Year of birth missing (living people)
Living people